Arhyssus scutatus is a species of scentless plant bug in the family Rhopalidae. It is found in North America.

References

 Thomas J. Henry, Richard C. Froeschner. (1988). Catalog of the Heteroptera, True Bugs of Canada and the Continental United States. Brill Academic Publishers.

Further reading

 

Insects described in 1859
Rhopalinae